Hawke Coachwork Limited was a New Zealand bus and coach body manufacturer.

Established in 1952 by brothers Haddon and Leslie Hawke, it was based on Great South Road, Takanini. It became a subsidiary of New Zealand Motor Corporation. In the late-1970s Australian bus manufacturer Pressed Metal Corporation acquired a minority stake in Hawke.

In 1983 Hawke merged with New Zealand Motor Bodies to form Coachwork International. The Takanini plant was retained, specialising in building and repairing buses for city authorities. As well as building bodies for New Zealand operators, Hawke completed buses for Singapore Bus Service.

References

External links

Bus manufacturers of New Zealand
Motor vehicle assembly plants in New Zealand
Vehicle manufacturing companies established in 1952
Vehicle manufacturing companies disestablished in 1983
New Zealand companies established in 1952
1983 disestablishments in New Zealand